"Wait for It... Wait for It!!" is a 7" vinyl single by Californian punk rock band Dead to Me, released on September 10, 2010 in Europe on Shield Recordings, to promote their 2010 European tour. Featuring three brand new songs, the record was also released on October 30, 2010 in the US by Brick Gun Records, at the Fest 9.

Track listing
All lyrics and music by Dead to Me.

7" version

Personnel

Band
 Chicken – bass guitar, lead vocals
 Sam Johnson – guitar, vocals
 Ken Yamazaki – guitar, backing vocals
 Ian Anderson – drums

References

2010 singles
Dead to Me songs
2010 songs
Shield Recordings albums